Niki Reiser (born 12 May 1958) is a Swiss film score composer and flautist. He is considered one of the most outstanding film composers of the German-speaking countries, winning the German Film Award five times. His debut was in 1986 the score for the film Du mich auch, directed by Dani Levy, for whom he has composed all further scores. He had his breakthrough with the music for the film Beyond Silence, directed by Caroline Link in 1996.

Biography 

Niki Reiser was born in 1958 in Reinach, Aargau in Switzerland, the son of a pastor and a nurse. Before he came to Basel age twelve, where he has lived since, he spent four years in Schaffhausen. In addition to classical flute lessons a child, he invented his own melodies on the piano. In his youth he played in several bands, composed pieces for them and for theater performances at school.

In the 1970s, Reiser studied classical music with an emphasis on flute in Basel. From 1980 to 1984 he studied in Boston at the Berklee College of Music jazz and classical music with a focus on film music. From 1984 to 1986, Reiser lived partly in Europe, mostly in Switzerland, where he continued his studies in composition in Basel. In workshops in the U.S., he met Ennio Morricone and Jerry Goldsmith who influenced his music. During this time he composed his first pieces for movies. During this period he also toured as a jazz flutist with the ensemble People, which he had co-founded.

In 1986, Reiser moved back to Europe where he met the film director Dani Levy. He composed the music for his first film Du mich auch. The film was a surprising success throughout Europe and was nominated for the Golden Camera at the Cannes International Film Festival in 1987. This encounter started a lasting friendship, resulting in Reiser composing the music for all of Levy's films.

At that time Reiser joined the klezmer band Kolsimcha as a flutist, and composed several pieces for the group. On two world tours he played with the band in Carnegie Hall and at the Montreux Jazz Festival, among others.

When Reiser realised that it was impossible to be a flutist and a composer at the same time, he concentrated on composition. In addition to working with Levy, he also composed for Caroline Link, whom he met in 1996. His breakthrough came with the music for her movie Beyond Silence. For her film Nowhere in Africa, Reiser studied African music in Nairobi. The influences of indigenous Kenyan music can be seen in the score he composed for the film. In addition to cinema and TV films, he also wrote music for the theater. In 2008 he worked again for Link for A Year Ago in Winter. The score won both the Preis der deutschen Filmkritik and the Deutscher Filmpreis of 2009.

Reiser has his studio in Basel's Gundeldingerfeld. He is on the board of the Deutsche Filmakademie since its inception in 2003.

Awards 
As of 2012, Reiser was awarded the German film prize Deutscher Filmpreis five times. In 2005, he was the 12th recipient of the Rheingau Music Prize, as "a composer who repeatedly and majestically succeeds in meeting the particular dramaturgical needs entailed by film scores, and thus suffusing each individual work with its own unique sound".

 1997 Bayerischer Filmpreis for Beyond Silence
 1997 Deutscher Filmpreis for Beyond Silence
 1999 Deutscher Filmpreis for Meschugge and Annaluise & Anton
 2001 Film music prize of the SUISA foundation for Cold Is the Evening Breeze
 2002 Deutscher Filmpreis for Nowhere in Africa
 2004 Preis der deutschen Filmkritik for Das fliegende Klassenzimmer
 2005 Deutscher Filmpreis for Alles auf Zucker!
 2005 Rheingau Music Prize
 2008 Bayerischer Filmpreis for Liebesleben
 2009 Preis der deutschen Filmkritik for A Year Ago in Winter
 2009 Deutscher Filmpreis for A Year Ago in Winter
 2011 Film music prize of the SUISA foundation Promising the Moon

Filmography 

 1986: Du mich auch – directed by Anja Franke, Dani Levy
 1986: Die Nacht der lebenden Schäffchen (short film) – directed by Walder, Zago
 1989: RobbyKallePaul – directed by Dani Levy
 1989: Abgeschleppt – directed by Dani Levy
 1992: I Was on Mars – directed by Dani Levy
 1993: Anna annA – directed by Jürgen Brauer, Greti Kläy
 1994:  – directed by Doris Dörrie
 1994: Wilder Hunger (short film) – directed by Hercli Bundi
 1995: Surprise! (short film) – directed by Veit Helmer
 1995: Silent Night – directed by Dani Levy
 1996: Beyond Silence – directed by Caroline Link
 1996: Liebling vergiß die Socken nicht – directed by Tobias Meinecke
 1996: Halbe Herzen (short film) – directed by 
 1997:  – directed by Andreas Kleinert
 1998: Meschugge – directed by Dani Levy
 1998:  – directed by Hermine Huntgeburth
 1999: Das Geheimnis der Sicherheit – directed by Dani Levy
 1999: Annaluise & Anton – directed by Caroline Link
 2000: Cold Is the Evening Breeze – directed by Rainer Kaufmann
 2000: Ein todsicheres Geschäft – directed by Matthias X. Oberg
 2001: Heaven (partly) – directed by Tom Tykwer
 2001: Nowhere in Africa – directed by Caroline Link
 2001: Heidi – directed by Markus Imboden
 2002: Das fliegende Klassenzimmer – directed by Tomy Wigand
 2002:  – directed by Dani Levy
 2003: Bouillabaisse – directed by Frank Papenbroock
 2004: Alles auf Zucker! – directed by Dani Levy
 2004: Summer Storm – directed by Marco Kreuzpaintner
 2005: The White Masai – directed by Hermine Huntgeburth
 2007: Love Life – directed by Maria Schrader
 2007: My Führer – The Really Truest Truth about Adolf Hitler – directed by Dani Levy
 2008: A Year Ago in Winter – directed by Caroline Link
 2009:  – directed by 
 2009: Die Wilden Hühner und das Leben – directed by Vivian Naefe
 2010:  – directed by Dani Levy
 2011:  – directed by Hans Steinbichler

References

External links 
 Official website (in German)
 

1958 births
Living people
People from Kulm District
Swiss composers
Swiss male composers
Swiss film score composers
Male film score composers
Swiss flautists
Berklee College of Music alumni